The 2015 Copa do Brasil Second Round was played from 22 April to 20 May 2015, to decide the 20 teams advancing to the Third Round.

Second round

|}

Match 41

Palmeiras won 6–2 on aggregate.

Match 42

Tied 3–3 on aggregate, ASA won on away goals.

Match 43

Botafogo won 5–1 on aggregate.

Match 44

Figueirense won 2–1 on aggregate.

Match 45

Santos won 3–2 on aggregate.

Match 46

Tied 2–2 on aggregate, Sport won on penalties.

Match 47

Flamengo advanced directly due to winning by 2 or more goals difference.

Match 48

Náutico advanced directly due to winning by 2 or more goals difference.

Match 49

Goiás won 3–1 on aggregate.

Match 50

Ituano won 3–2 on aggregate.

Match 51

Tied 3–3 on aggregate, Coritiba won on penalties.

Match 52

Ponte Preta won 6–2 on aggregate.

Match 53

Tied 1–1 on aggregate, Vasco da Gama won on away goals.

Match 54

América de Natal won 4–3 on aggregate.

Match 55

Tied 2–2 on aggregate, Tupi won on away goals.

Match 56

Ceará won 4–1 on aggregate.

Match 57

Grêmio advanced directly due to winning by 2 or more goals difference.

Match 58

Criciúma advanced directly due to winning by 2 or more goals difference.

Match 59

Bahia won 3–1 on aggregate.

Match 60

Paysandu won 3–1 on aggregate.

References

2